The Black Duck River is a river in the provinces of Manitoba and Ontario, Canada. Flowing northeast from Hosea Lake in Kenora District in Northwestern Ontario, the river criss-crosses the Manitoba-Ontario border before reaching to its mouth at Hudson Bay in the Northern Region of Manitoba just west of Manitoba's easternmost point where the inter-provincial border meets the bay.

Course
The river starts at Hosea Lake and ends at Hudson Bay.

References

Rivers of Kenora District
Rivers of Northern Manitoba
Tributaries of Hudson Bay